Stefan Lorenz Sorgner is a German metahumanist philosopher, a Nietzsche scholar, a philosopher of music and an authority in the field of ethics of emerging technologies.

Life
Sorgner was born on 15 October 1973 in Wetzlar (Germany). He studied philosophy at King's College London (BA), the University of Durham (MA by thesis; examiners: David E. Cooper, Durham; David Owen, Southampton), the Justus-Liebig-Universität Gießen and the Friedrich-Schiller-Universität Jena (Dr. phil.; Examiners: Wolfgang Welsch, Jena; Gianni Vattimo, Turin). He taught philosophy and ethics at the Universities of Giessen, Jena, Erfurt and Erlangen. Currently, he teaches at a US Liberal Arts College, John Cabot University. Sorgner is a member of several editorial and advisory boards.

Nietzsche, posthumanism and transhumanism
In issue 20(1) of the Journal of Evolution and Technology, Sorgner's article “Nietzsche, the Overhuman, and Transhumanism” was published in which he shows that there are significant similarities between Nietzsche's concept of the overhuman and the concept of the posthuman according to the view of some transhumanists. His interpretation brought about a response both among Nietzsche scholars as well as among transhumanists. The editors of the Journal of Evolution and Technology dedicated a special issue to the question concerning the relationship between transhumanism, Nietzsche and European posthumanist philosophies (posthumanism). Vol. 21 Issue 1 – January 2010 of the Journal of Evolution and Technology was entitled "Nietzsche and European Posthumanisms" and it included responses to Sorgner's article, for example by Max More, Michael Hauskeller. Due to the intense debate, the editors of the journal decided to give Sorgner the chance to react to the articles. In vol. 21 Issue 2 – October 2010, Sorgner replied to the various responses in his article "Beyond Humanism: Reflections on Trans- and Posthumanism". In addition, herein he also put forward some aspects of his own philosophical position which was strongly influenced by his teacher Gianni Vattimo. He accepts Vattimo's pensiero debole, but criticises Vattimo's understanding of the history of the weakening of being. As an alternative, Sorgner suggests a this-worldly, naturalist and perspectivist interpretation of the world, which he explained in more detail in his 2010 monograph "Menschenwürde nach Nietzsche: Die Geschichte eines Begriffs" (WBG, Darmstadt 2010). Sorgner regards "Nihilism", as described by Nietzsche, "entirely a gain": „From the perspective of my perspectivism, this also means that the prevalent conception of human dignity has no higher status in hitting truth as correspondence to reality than the conceptions of Adolf Hitler or Pol Pot." After bioethicists, and transhumanists had discussed the relationship between Nietzsche and transhumanism, the debate was taken up by some leading Nietzsche scholars: Keith Ansell-Pearson, Paul Loeb and Babette Babich wrote responses in the journal the Agonist which is being published by the Nietzsche Circle New York. Sorgner's perspectivist metahumanism and in particular his monograph "Menschenwürde nach Nietzsche" (WBG 2010) was dealt with in a symposium organised by the Nietzsche Forum Munich which had been co-founded by Thomas Mann. Leading German philosophers, e.g. Annemarie Pieper, responded to Sorgner's radical suggestions concerning the need to revise the prevalent conception of human dignity at this event. In May 2013, the weekly newspaper Die Zeit published an interview with Sorgner in which several of his suggestions concerning human dignity, emerging technologies and trans- and posthumanism were summarized. In Autumn 2014, an essay collection entitled "Umwertung der Menschenwürde" (edited by Beatrix Vogel) was published by Alber Verlag in which leading international theologians, philosophers, and ethicists wrote critical replies to Sorgner's suggestions concerning the notion "human dignity". Sorgner has been an invited and keynote speaker at many important events and conferences, e.g. , TED, and the World Humanities Forum, ICISTS-KAIST. According to Prof. Dr. Zimmmermann of the Identity Foundation, a recently set-up German private think tank, Sorgner is “Germany’s leading post- and transhumanist philosopher” („Deutschlands führender post- und transhumanistischer Philosoph“).

References

External links
 
 Review of the English translation of On Trans-humanism

Year of birth missing (living people)
Living people
Alumni of King's College London
German philosophers
Place of birth missing (living people)
German male writers
Nietzsche scholars
Ethics of science and technology
German transhumanists
Alumni of Durham University